Rašče is a village in the municipality of Saraj, North Macedonia.

Demographics
According to the 2021 census, the village had a total of 2.835 inhabitants. Ethnic groups in the village include:

Albanians 2.760
Macedonians 1
Others 74

References

External links

Villages in Saraj Municipality
Albanian communities in North Macedonia